Adele "Delia" Lindley Straup (November 27, 1866 - September 15, 1947) was an American educator and club woman.

Early life
Adele "Delia" Lindley was born November 27, 1866, in South Bend, Indiana, the daughter of Ashbury Lindley (1830-1906) and Mary Elizabeth Huston (1835-1886).

Career
Delia L. Straup taught school in Indiana and in Salt Lake City; she served for two years as president of Women's Republican Club; for one year, she was president of the Ladies Literary Club and Reviewers Club.

Personal life
Delia L. Straup moved to Utah in 1896 and lived at 225 S. 12th East St., Salt Lake City, Utah.

In April 1889, in Valparaiso, Indiana, she married Judge Daniel Newton Straup (1862-1945), an associate justice for the Utah State Supreme Court, and had three children: Cordelia (1897-1990), Rosalind (1899-1982), Danella (1902-1996). 

She died on September 15, 1947, and is buried at Mount Olivet Cemetery (Salt Lake City), with her husband.

References

1866 births
1947 deaths
People from South Bend, Indiana
Educators from Indiana
American women educators
Clubwomen